Gar may be a clan name, given name and/or nickname.

Tibetan clan name
The Gar, mGar or sGar clan has included the following people:
 Gar Tongtsen Yülsung (590–667), Tibetan Empire general and Great Minister
 Gar Tsenye Dompu (died 685), Tibetan Empire general, eldest son of Gar Tongtsen Yülsung
 Gar Trinring Tsendro (died 699), Tibetan Empire general, son of Gar Tongtsen Yülsung
 Gar Mangsham Sumnang, 7th century Tibetan Empire general and Great Minister

Given name or nickname
 Gar Alperovitz (born 1936), American political economist and historian
 Gar Baxter (born c. 1929), Canadian former football player
 Gar Forman, American National Basketball Association team executive
 Gar Anthony Haywood (born 1954), American author of crime fiction
 Gar Heard (born Garfield Heard, 1948), American retired National Basketball Association player and coach
 Garton Hone (1901–1991), Australian tennis and cricket player
 Gar Joseph, American journalist
 Gar Knutson, also known as Thomas Garfield (born 1956), Canadian politician and lawyer
 Edgar Martínez, American former baseball player
 Edgar Moon (1904–1976), Australian tennis player
 Gar Samuelson (1958–1999), former drummer for metal band Megadeth
 Gar Waddy (1879–1963), Australian cricketer
 Garfield Wood (1880–1971), American inventor, entrepreneur, motorboat builder, racer and world speed record holder

Given names
Hypocorisms